Freziera ciliata is a species of plant in the Pentaphylacaceae family. It is endemic to Peru.

References

Endemic flora of Peru
ciliata
Vulnerable plants
Taxonomy articles created by Polbot